The M-class minelayers were a class of eight (nine planned) small controlled minelayers commissioned into the Royal Navy between 1939 and 1943.

Ships

References 

Ship classes of the Royal Navy
Minelayers of the Royal Navy